"When I'm Gone" is a song by American rock band 3 Doors Down. It was released on September 23, 2002, as the lead single from their second album, Away from the Sun. It peaked at number four on the Billboard Hot 100 chart in April 2003. The song also spent seventeen weeks atop the Billboard Hot Mainstream Rock Tracks chart from November 2002 through March 2003, becoming one of the longest-running number-one singles on that chart. The song also peaked at number two on the Hot Modern Rock Tracks chart almost reaching number one by one spot from Queens of the Stone Age's "No One Knows" on the issue dated February 15, 2003. It spent one week atop the Top 40 Mainstream chart for one week on May 3, 2003, and also peaked at number three on the Adult Top 40 chart.

The song has been featured in the crime drama series Third Watch, in the episode "A Ticket Grows in Brooklyn" (2003).

Background and meaning
"When I'm Gone" was written by Brad Arnold, Matthew Roberts, Todd Harrell and Christopher Henderson. "There are only a few songs we’ve written on the road and 'When I’m Gone' is the only hit we’ve written on the road," Todd Harrell said on the band's official website. "We were playing it in Europe and could immediately tell it was something special. From day one, it got the crowd up. I always knew it would do well," Harrell continued.

Brad Arnold wrote the song thinking of unconditional love, for when being removed from loved one by miles, or time, or other obstacles. "When I'm Gone" does not necessarily mean being gone permanently. "It's asking a question, just please love me when I'm gone. And not just like when I'm dead and gone, but when I'm gonna come back. And that's kind of one thing it's about. But at the same time it's kind of about unconditional love. It's a lot of different statements it's asking of the person in that song. And it's like just the fulfillment of those different needs for every situation that it mentions. So I guess that song is just about needing someone really to be there for you unconditionally, and when you're gone," Arnold said of the song.

Music video
There are two music videos for the song. The official music video was directed by The Emperor. It features the band performing live on the USS George Washington in the Mediterranean Sea on October 2, 2002. Although the lyrics don't have anything to do with the army or war, the music video was dedicated to all military personnel serving in the United States military.

The original video features the band members in a swamp, being buried alive while playing.

Live performances
"When I'm Gone" was first performed live on February 28, 2001, at Spartanburg Memorial Auditorium in Spartanburg, South Carolina. As of April 1, 2019, it has been performed 445 times, making it the fourth most performed song by 3 Doors Down.

Track listings

Canadian CD single
 "When I'm Gone" – 4:15
 "Living a Lie" – 3:35

European CD single
 "When I'm Gone" – 4:15
 "Changes" – 3:56
 "Living a Lie" – 3:35
 "Pop Song" – 3:12

Australian CD single
 "When I'm Gone" (album version) – 4:20
 "Changes" – 3:56
 "Living a Lie" – 3:35
 "Pop Song" – 3:12

Charts

Weekly charts

Year-end charts

Certifications

Release history

References

2002 singles
2002 songs
3 Doors Down songs
Republic Records singles
Song recordings produced by Rick Parashar
Songs written by Brad Arnold
Songs written by Todd Harrell
Songs written by Chris Henderson (American musician)
Songs written by Matt Roberts (musician)